René Simon (8 December 1885 – 21 April 1947) was a French aviator.

Biography 
He was born in Paris and earned French license #177 from the Aero Club De France. He toured the United States in 1911–12 with the Moisant International Aviators. He became known for daring tactics and was called the Flying-Fool by the public. The first airplane rescue at sea by another airplane was made when on 14 August 1911 Simon had been flying over Lake Michigan in a monoplane and accidentally dived too low. Pilot Hugh Robinson in a Curtiss hydroplane spotted him and sent boats to his rescue.

In February 1911 the Mexican government engaged Simon to reconnoiter rebel positions near Juarez, Mexico. During World War I he commanded a squadron that taught acrobatic tactics to fighter pilots. Simon was married by the time of World War I and had a commission as a Capitaine(Captain). He and his wife often dined with high-ranking military officials.

René Simon died in Cannes on 21 April 1947.

See also
List of pilots awarded an Aviator's Certificate by the Aéro-Club de France in 1910.

References

Sources 

1885 births
1947 deaths
Aviators from Paris
Aviation pioneers
French World War I pilots
French military personnel of World War I